Fangshan is a railway station on the Taiwan Railways Administration South-link line located in Shizi Township, Pingtung County, Taiwan. The station is the southernmost station in Taiwan.

History
The station was opened on 5 October 1992.

See also
 List of railway stations in Taiwan

References

1992 establishments in Taiwan
Railway stations in Pingtung County
Railway stations opened in 1992
Railway stations served by Taiwan Railways Administration